The Torino Jazz Festival (initiated in 2012) is a jazz festival held in the city of Turin.

The Torino Jazz Festival was created to enhance the jazz tradition in Torino, and quickly became an important point of reference in the European music scene.

During the event, besides the energy of the solos and jam session, there is meetings, sound performances achieved in public and private areas, and musical incursions in atypical places. More than 20 town clubs will participate, where jazz will be played all year round by 250 musicians. In the 8 days, Turin turns into an open-air jazz venue, where some of the best jazz musicians in the world perform, invading the historic center and all the streets, squares, bars and clubs of the city.

References

External links 
 

Jazz festivals in Italy
2012 establishments in Italy
Recurring events established in 2012
Annual events in Italy